Singa Laoet (Perfected Spelling: Singa Laut; Indonesian for The Sea Lion or The Merlion) is a 1941 film from the Dutch East Indies (today Indonesia). Directed by Tan Tjoei Hock and produced by The Teng Chun, it starred Tan Tjen Bok, Mohamad Mochtar, and Hadidjah.

Plot
Robin is exiled from society after he is accused of murdering a man named Ibrahim in a fight. Twenty years later Ibrahim's son, Mahmud, begins a search for his father's killer. He soon reaches the island of Sampojo, where he finds Robin. The exile has taken up piracy and now uses the name "Singa Laoet" (The Sea Lion). After one of Robin's men, Hasan, kidnaps a girl whom he loves, Mahmud tracks the kidnapper down and fights him to the death. It is later revealed that Hasan, not Robin, was the one who killed Ibrahim.

Production
Singa Laoet was directed by Tan Tjoei Hock, a Chinese-Indonesian director who had been attached to The Teng Chun's Java Industrial Film since 1940; They produced the film for Action Film, a subsidiary of Java Industrial Film. Tan is also credited with the screenwriting, cinematography, and sound editing of this 76-minute-long black-and-white film. Production of this film was mostly finished by October 1941.

The film starred Tan Tjeng Bok, Hadidjah, Bissu, and Mohamad Mochtar. Three of the actors had extended experience with Java Industrial Film: Bissu had made his screen debut for the company in 1938's Oh Iboe, Hadidjah had joined with her husband Mas Sardi in 1939 for Roesia si Pengkor, and Mochtar had appeared in Alang-Alang later that year after being discovered in a barbershop. Tan Tjeng Bok, a former stage star with Dardanella, was a more recent hire, only having made his film debut in the company's 1941 production Srigala Item.

Release and reception
Singa Laoet was released in late 1941, having reached Surabaya by November. In the city it was advertised as capable of making viewer's blood pump faster through their veins, while the panoramas of the Indies were described as picturesque and beautiful. The film was open to audiences of all ages. A reviewer in the Surabaya-based Soerabaijasch Handelsblad found that the film would likely be popular with ethnic Chinese and Native audiences.

Theatrical screenings of Singa Laoet continued as late as 1945. According to J.B. Kristanto's Katalog Film Indonesia, a 35 mm copy of the film is held at Sinematek Indonesia in Jakarta.

References

Works cited

 
 
 

 

1941 films
Dutch East Indies films
Films directed by Tan Tjoei Hock
Indonesian black-and-white films